Datakit is a virtual circuit switch which was developed by Sandy Fraser at Bell Labs for both local-area and wide-area networks, and in widespread deployment by the Regional Bell Operating Companies (RBOCs).

Datakit uses a cell relay protocol similar to Asynchronous Transfer Mode. Datakit is a connection-oriented switch, with all packets for a particular call traveling through the network over the same virtual circuit. Datakit networks are still in widespread use by the major telephone companies in the United States.

Interfaces to these networks include TCP/IP and UDP, X.25, asynchronous protocols and several synchronous protocols, such as SDLC, HDLC, Bisync and others. These networks support host to terminal traffic and vice versa, host-to-host traffic, file transfers, remote login, remote printing, and remote command execution. At the physical layer, it can operate over multiple media, from slow speed EIA-232 to 500Mbit fiber optic links including 10/100 Megabit ethernet links.

Most of Bell Laboratories was trunked together via Datakit networking. On top of Datakit transport service, several operating systems (including UNIX) implemented UUCP for electronic mail and dkcu for remote login.

Datakit uses an adaptation protocol called Universal Receiver Protocol (URP) that spreads PDU overhead across multiple cells and performs immediate packet processing. URP assumes that cells arrive in order and may force retransmissions if not.

The Information Systems Network (ISN) was the pre-version of Datakit that was supported by the former AT&T Information Systems. The ISN was a packet switching network that was built similar to digital System 75 platform.

LAN and WAN applications with the use of what was referred to as a Concentrator that was connected via fiber optics up to 15 miles away from the main ISN. The speeds of these connections were very slow to today's standards, from 1200 to 5600 baud with most connections / end users on dumb terminals. The main support for this product came from the NCSC (National Customer Support Center) in Englewood CO then later AT&T Information Systems as the company reorganized and Bell Labs.

It was in production three or more years prior to the Datakit being released. Datakit was programmed similar to a Central Office with area code and seven digit location.  

In 1996, AT&T spun off Bell Labs as a separate company, Lucent Technologies–who would later merge with the French firm Alcatel to become Alcatel-Lucent, before finally being acquired by Nokia in 2016. By the late 1990s, Datakit was clearly a legacy technology, being superseded by newer technologies such as IP and Ethernet. Lucent decided to discontinue their Datakit product line, but a group of former Lucent employees started a new firm, Datatek Applications, who licensed the technology from Lucent, and aimed to support the remaining Datakit users and provide gateway solutions to assist in their migration to newer technologies. In part due to the continuing decline in Datakit use, Datatek Applications went out of business in January 2018.

See also
Cell relay
X.25

References

Wide area networks
Packets (information technology)
Computer networking